A total solar eclipse will occur on Sunday, September 2, 2035. A solar eclipse occurs when the Moon passes between Earth and the Sun, thereby totally or partly obscuring the image of the Sun for a viewer on Earth. A total solar eclipse occurs when the Moon's apparent diameter is larger than the Sun's, blocking all direct sunlight, turning day into darkness. Totality occurs in a narrow path across Earth's surface, with the partial solar eclipse visible over a surrounding region thousands of kilometres wide.

Visibility 

The path of totality will cross two Asian capital cities, Beijing, China and Pyongyang, North Korea, and will pass north of a third, Tokyo, Japan.

Related eclipses

Solar eclipses of 2033–2036

Saros 145

Inex series

Tritos series

Metonic series

References

External links 
 NASA graphics

2035 09 02
2035 in science
2035 09 02
2035 09 02